The HTC Universal is a Windows Mobile 5.0 Pocket PC PDA manufactured by High Tech Computer Corporation. It was the first 3G/UMTS-enabled Pocket PC PDA with a telecommunications function, and also the first to come with Windows Mobile 5.0 pre-installed.

It was sold by many different vendors under the names of O2 xda Exec, Orange SPV M5000, Dopod 900, Qtek 9000, T-Mobile MDA Pro, I-mate JasJar, Vodafone v1640, Vodafone VPA IV, E-Plus PDA IV, etc. Despite all the different model names and housing appearance, they all have identical hardware specifications with small differences in the external color and branding.

The most eye-catching feature of this device is its 180-degree swivel screen, allowing a quick swap between portrait mode and landscape mode. The GUI automatically adjusts screen orientation accordingly.

SIM lock 
Most network-supplied versions of the Universal are shipped SIM-locked, with the O2 XDA Exec being a notable exception. HowevXdaer, a free SIM unlocking tool was released.  This process involves flashing a new Radio ROM onto the device, and it may invalidate the warranty.

Detailed specifications 
Screen Size: 3.7 in (9.4 cm) Transflective LCD
Screen Resolution: 640 x 480 VGA at 216 ppi
Input: 62-key QWERTY keyboard and touchscreen with stylus (included; stylus also available separately for 19 EUR as of October 2008)
Cameras: 2
1.3 MP CMOS Camera with LED "flash" mounted on the reverse of the keyboard section
QVGA (320 x 240) CMOS Camera for 3G video calling, mounted beside the screen, close to the hinge
Processor: Intel Bulverde (PXA270) 520 MHz CPU
Memory: Flash ROM: 128 MB, RAM: 128 MB/64 MB SDRAM
Memory expansion: SDIO/MMC card slot (officially without SDHC, with maximum capacity supported being 4GB, but there is unofficial SDHC support from xda-developers  SDHC cards are accepted with Windows Mobile 6.1 or higher and there is another unofficial update to Windows Mobile 5 that allows the use of SDXC cards up to 64GB.)
Network Standard: Tri-Band GSM/GPRS (900/1800/1900) + WCDMA (UMTS) (2100 MHz)
GPRS: Class B Multi-slot standard class 10 PBCCH MO/MT SMS over GPRS
Connection interface: Client only Mini-USB connector, USB charging, USB 2.0 protocol
Wireless connectivity: Infrared IrDA FIR, Bluetooth 1.2 Class 2 compliant, WiFi 802.11b IEEE 802.11b compliant, Internal Antenna, 11, 5.5, 2 and 1 Mbit/s per channel, 64-, 128-bit WEP and WPA standard data encryption
Standard battery capacity: 1620 mAh (included; battery is removable)
Charging: Mini USB (also used for data transfer)

Extended batteries 
There are many high-capacity "extended" batteries available for the HTC Universal. 2600mAh, 3150mAh, 3200mAh, 3800mAh, 4800mAh and even 5200mAh models have been sold by various retailers, which allow the device to run for more than a week in many cases on a single charge (with light to medium use). All extended batteries have one big drawback though, they are all supplied with a new plastic back to hold the battery, which considerably increases the size and weight of the device.

The 3800 mAh battery is a Li Ion battery with model number PU16B manufactured by Dynapack International Technology Corporation in Taiwan.  It is rated at 3.7 VDC (or 4.2 VDC).  It increased the weight of HTC Universal to 350 g.  It allows the use of the camera by holes built in the battery plastic container.  Its price is about 30 EUR as of October 2008.  With this battery, HTC Universal can operate up to 200 hours without GSM/UMTS/Bluetooth/WiFi or about 100–150 hours with UMTS and Bluetooth on.

Unofficial extensions 
With registry editing and/or ROM re-flashing (both of which should only be done by people who are confident and experienced with these processes), substantial extra functionality can be added to this device. A few examples follow (there are many more):

Wireless G (802.11g) connectivity. This only allows the device to communicate using the 802.11g protocol instead of 802.11b, it does not give a speed increase beyond 11 Mbit. However, numerous online sources now say this no longer works.
Full emulation of an "SD card reader" (USB mass storage device class).
Full VGA (640 x 480 resolution) graphics, as opposed to the "QVGA (320 x 240) emulation/compatibility mode" which the Universal runs in by default. The two main downsides to this are that some software cannot handle "true VGA" mode, which usually results in corrupted graphics, and that it can be quite difficult to see (and use a stylus with) such small screen elements as text.
Emulation and mapping of additional keys not found on the Universal native keyboard, such as CTRL and ALT.
Support for SDHC cards. 8 GB, 16 GB and 32 GB cards have been tested successfully. This is only made possible via a third-party hacked driver.
128 MB of RAM. It is possible to replace 64 MB memory modules with 128 MB one. It can be only used with 128 MB enabled ROMs but it makes more space for running applications.

Linux 
It is possible to install a custom version of Linux on the HTC Universal. Despite the lack of cooperation by HTC (and most other smartphone/PPC manufacturers for that matter), drivers for most of the device's components are functional (the two cameras and the flash ROM being the only significant exceptions). It is possible to run various handheld Linux distributions on the Universal, though application support is in its infancy.

Windows Mobile 6 (Crossbow) 
There are numerous "unofficial" builds of Windows Mobile 6 (Crossbow) which have been made to run on this device, and now even some tools whthatllow users to create their own custom WM6 ROM images (a process commonly known by the term "cooking ROMs"). There is a thriving community of people dedicated to improving these WM6 builds (and associated tools) on the Universal.

References

External links
xda-developers Probably the largest community of Pocket PC phone users out there. The majority of "unofficial" WM6 ROM development/hacking for the Universal & many other PPC phones is located here.
Android on the HTC Universal
www.iPocketPC.Net The largest software website for free HTC software for Pocket PC and Windows Mobile.
 See, in particular, the HTC Universal section of the xda-developers' wiki
Linux on Universal status page
The supported hardware page of the Openmoko project
Runnable Linux images for the HTC Universal
Titchy Mobile - Debian GNU/Linux on the HTC Universal
Linux on the HTC Universal

Windows Mobile Professional devices
Universal
Mobile phones with an integrated hardware keyboard
Mobile phones with infrared transmitter